Johann Schwarz (1891–1914) was an Austrian footballer. He played in three matches for the Austria national football team from 1911 to 1913.

References

External links
 

1891 births
1914 deaths
Austrian footballers
Austria international footballers
Place of birth missing
Association footballers not categorized by position